Mignon desires her fatherland is an 1836 painting by the Dutch-French artist Ary Scheffer. The picture depicts a young woman Mignon, inspired from a character in Goethe's 1795-96 novel Wilhelm Meister's Apprenticeship. The 1866 Ambroise Thomas opera Mignon was based on the same character, and Scheffer's feminine representation of Mignon in a dress influenced her portrayal by Thomas. The painting currently hangs in the Dordrechts Museum in Dordrecht, Netherlands.

Related paintings

References

1836 paintings
Paintings by Ary Scheffer
Works based on Wilhelm Meister's Apprenticeship
Paintings based on literature